Sebastian Brigović (born 20 April 1992 in Rijeka, Croatia) is a Croatian alpine skier. He will compete for Croatia at the 2014 Winter Olympics in the giant slalom event.

References 

Living people
Olympic alpine skiers of Croatia
Alpine skiers at the 2014 Winter Olympics
Croatian male alpine skiers
1992 births